Guido Calvi (1 May 1893 - 6 September 1958) was an Italian middle-distance runner who competed at the 1912 Summer Olympics.

National titles
Italian Athletics Championships
1000 metres: 1910

References

External links 
 

1893 births
1958 deaths
Athletes (track and field) at the 1912 Summer Olympics
Italian male middle-distance runners
Olympic athletes of Italy
Sportspeople from Bergamo